The 2019–20 ABL season was the tenth season of competition of the ASEAN Basketball League. The regular season started on 16 November 2019 and was set to end on 28 March 2020.

On 15 July 2020, the league announced the cancellation of the season due to the COVID-19 pandemic outbreak. No league title was awarded.

Teams
Listed are the following team changes that happened before the start of the season:
 Taipei Fubon Braves becomes the 2nd team in the ABL from Taiwan.
 CLS Knights Indonesia as the defending champion officially announced that they will not be competing in this season.
 The Wolf Warriors relocated from Zhuhai to Macau; they still retained the Wolf Warriors name.
 Westports Malaysia Dragons was renamed into the Kuala Lumpur Dragons.

Venues

Personnel

Imports

Local Heritage

Regular season
Each team will play 26 games throughout the season, 13 at home and 13 away. Each team will play the remaining 4 teams in their group, twice each at home and away. Each team will also play the 5 teams from the other group, once each at home and away. The groupings are as follows:
 Bears, Warriors, Eastern, Dreamers, Braves
 Alab, Slingers, Dragons, Vampire, Heat

After the league season was suspended due to COVID-19 pandemic, group leaders, Mono Vampire decided to withdraw from the league.

Standings

Results

Awards

End-of-season awards

Players of the Week

Players of the Month

References

External links
 Official website

 
2019–20 in Asian basketball leagues
2019-20
2019–20 in Chinese basketball
2019–20 in Hong Kong basketball
2019–20 in Malaysian basketball
2019–20 in Philippine basketball leagues
2019–20 in Singaporean basketball
2019–20 in Taiwanese basketball
2019–20 in Thai basketball
2019–20 in Vietnamese basketball
Basketball events curtailed and voided due to the COVID-19 pandemic